Linley House is a heritage-listed house located at 360 Burns Bay Road, Linley Point in the Lane Cove Council local government area of New South Wales, Australia. It is also known as Linley and Grenaby. The property is privately owned. It was added to the New South Wales State Heritage Register on 2 April 1999.

History

Heritage listing 

Linley was listed on the New South Wales State Heritage Register on 2 April 1999.

References

Attribution 

New South Wales State Heritage Register
Lane Cove Council
Houses in Sydney
Articles incorporating text from the New South Wales State Heritage Register